Mouzouras is a village and a community in the municipal unit of Akrotiri, Chania regional unit, on the island of Crete, Greece. The community consists of the settlements Mouzouras, Agia Zoni, Galini and Kalorrouma. 

Populated places in Chania (regional unit)